Ringier AG is a media group in Switzerland, founded in 1833 in Zofingen and based in Zürich. The current strategy is based not only on media but also on e-commerce and entertainment. It has a yearly income of approximately 1000 million CHF and around 6,400 employees in nineteen countries.

Activities
The worldwide activities of Ringier include:

Information in print and digital publications with strong media.
The digital business, mainly internet based and mobile e-commerce-services like shopping webpages or online marketplaces.
The entertainment sector includes all activities around television, radio, events and amusement-services (such as ticketing).

Publications

Switzerland 

In the German language:
 Blick and Sonntags-Blick
 Bolero
 Cash (Online-Wirtschafts- und -Finanzplattform)
 Glückspost
 Landliebe
 TV Täglich
 Schweizer Illustrierte / SI Style

In the French language:
 L'Illustré
 TV8
 Le Temps (until 1 January 2021)

Europe, Africa and Asia 
Together with the German publishing company Axel Springer Ringier launched in 2010 the joint venture Ringier Axel Springer Media AG. The joint venture is present in:

 Bulgaria
 Hungary
 Poland
 Serbia
 Slovakia

In other countries in Asia and Africa, such as Vietnam, Myanmar, Ghana, Senegal, Nigeria, Kenya, Uganda]], Ivory Coast and South Africa, Ringier publishes different media on- and offline.

Entertainment
Radio stations, TV shows, events, ticketing and marketing services. Ringier Entertainment is closely linked to the media world, plays popular music, produces TV shows, and organises and hosts major lifestyle and sporting events.

TV
BlickTV and Landliebe TV.

Radio
The portfolio includes the two private radio stations Energy Zurich and Energy Bern, where Ringier and the NRJ Group both take shares in. In addition to this, Ringier holds a minority shareholding in Energy Basel.

Events
Ringier organizes the music festival Moon and Stars in Locarno as well as Radio Energy's event formats Energy Star Night, Energy Live Session, Energy Fashion Night, Energy Air.

Services
The group participates in several marketing and consulting services in the entertainment and events sector.

InfrontRingier: sports marketing agency, i.a. Swiss Football League, Swiss Ice Hockey Cup, Tour de Suisse, Swiss Indoors Basel, B2RUN

Ticketcorner: marketing and sales of events

Digital
Ringier Digital is the fastest-growing business unit of Ringier AG. Its portfolio includes the leading Swiss online marketplaces and e-commerce platforms.

Marketplaces
The leading online marketplaces in Switzerland belong to the portfolio of Ringier. Scout24, which includes the brands AutoScout24, MotoScout24, ImmoScout24 and JobScout24, and JobCloud are the market leaders in the online classified ad market for cars, real estate, jobs and personal ads. Since spring 2016 la Mobilière holds 50% of shares in Scout24 Switzerland AG. Ringier however still consolidates the company.

Internet
Ringier also holds e-commerce platforms like DeinDeal.ch and geschenkidee.ch. In cooperation with bank zweiplus, Ringier manages the platform cash.ch.

Ringier School of Journalism
In 1974, Hans Ringier founded the first journalism school  in Switzerland. Since then, many of today's prominent media-creators have learned the journalistic trade at the «Jou-Schu». Even publisher Michael Ringier and Ringier's CEO Marc Walder attended the in-house school. The journalism school is operated by the Hans Ringier Foundation. The president of the foundation board is Frank A. Meyer. Hannes Britschgi heads up the Ringier School of Journalism.

Printing plants
Essential to the main business of the company are several printing plants in Switzerland (Zofingen and Adligenswil). The printing plant in Zofingen was founded in 1833 and has since then been integrated into Swissprinters. Since 1975 Ringier Print in Adligenswil prints internal and external newspapers.

Other activities
Ringier holds a minority shareholding in Sat. 1 Schweiz AG, in SMD Schweizer Mediendatenbank and in Schober Direct Media AG.

History
In 1833 Johann Rudolf Ringier purchased a printing plant in the Swiss town of Zofingen and began by printing regional gazettes and school curriculums. The small workshop soon evolved into a national newspaper-publishing house. Schweizer Illustrierte was first published in 1911 using letterpress.  It was Switzerland's most successful people magazine and remains so to this day. Ten years later the equivalent for French-speaking Switzerland L’Illustré was launched. Between 1948 and 1994 Ringier published comic stories of Ringgi and Zofi.

In 1959 Ringier took the Swiss public by surprise launching the country's first tabloid, Blick. With SonntagsBlick appeared the first Sunday Paper in 1969 on the market. In 1974, Hans Ringier founded the first journalism school in Switzerland.

In 1977 Schweizerische Allgemeine Volkszeitung became Glückspost. The Ringier-Pressehaus in Zurich Seefeld was opened in 1978. In the 1970s, the Swiss Ringier AG acquired the Munich publisher “Heering-Verlag” and changed the name to “Ringier Deutschland GmbH” (Ringier Germany). The publishing house primarily focused on photography for books and magazines. Ringier Germany employed around 100 people and published eight monthly magazines plus special editions (e.g. Globo, Kundenmagazin BMW, fotoMagazin). In 2001 Ringier Germany closed its doors. In 2004, Ringier Publishing GmbH in Berlin launched the magazine Cicero and thus returned to the German market.
The printing plant Times-Ringier in Hongkong was founded and opened in 1987. In 1989 and 1990 business began in Czech Republic and Romania. The programmes Cash-TV, Spotlights, MotorShow and Gesundheit-SprechStunde launched in 1993, two years before the show PresseTV was first broadcast. In the same year, activities in Bulgaria, Poland, Hungary and Vietnam started. However the activities in Poland and Bulgaria stopped after three years. In 1999 Ringier acquired a 50% share in the TV-channel Sat.1 Schweiz.

In 2001 Ringier sold half the shares of Betty Bossi to Coop. On 15 May 2006, the company launched heute, Switzerland's first free evening newspaper. Blick am Abend replaced heute on 2 June 2008. In June 2007, the publication of the economic journal Cash was stopped after 18 years. On 21 December 2012, Coop acquired the remaining 50% shares of Betty Bossi from Ringier.

On 24 November 2005, Chairman Michael Ringier announced that former German chancellor Gerhard Schröder will advise the company in important matters starting January 2006.

In 2009 Ringier transferred its physical picture archive to the Aargau state archive.

In 2010 the editorial offices of Blick, SonntagsBlick, Blick am Abend and Blick.ch, together with Web-TV, were joined to form the largest and most modern newsroom in the country.

The gradual expansion into the growth markets in Africa in 2011, focused primarily on digital services.

At the beginning of 2012 Ringier founded a joint venture with bank zweiplus under the existing umbrella brand cash, which offers online-, finance- and economic information, online financial-services and online banking. The entire direct client business of bank zweiplus was outsourced into this company.

Together with zurich publishing house Tamedia, Ringier acquired the jobs.ch Holding AG from the US associated company Tiger Global Management. In October 2012, the competition commission gave its approval for the acquisition of the largest job platform in Switzerland.

In July 2014 Ringier announced the sale of 49% shares of the subsidiary Scout24 Switzerland AG to the American investor KKR. This partnership was the first of its kind in the 180-year company history of Ringier. By spring 2016, la Mobilière took over the shares of KKR and since then holds 50% of the Scout24 Switzerland AG. Ringier still consolidates the company.

Joint Venture with Axel Springer in Eastern Europe
On 23 March 2010, Ringier and the German media company Axel Springer SE announced their intention to form a joint venture headquartered in Zurich, both companies hold 50%. The joint venture is called Ringier Axel Springer Media AG. Axel Springer AG paid a contribution in cash of around EUR 50 million and paid EUR 125 million to compensate Ringier. The purpose of the joint venture is to combine all activities in Eastern Europe of the two companies inside one holding. Axel Springer AG brought the business of its subsidiaries in Poland, Czech Republic and Hungary, while Ringier brought its business in Serbia, Slovakia, Czech Republic and Hungary. Ringier and Axel Springer together own  over 100 print titles (34 newspapers, 73 magazines) and more than 70 online platforms and established themselves as one of the biggest media companies in the Eastern Europe market (March 2010). Overall the joint venture is the market leader in tabloids and one of the largest provider of magazines. Mark Dekan is currently the CEO of Ringier Axel Springer Media AG.  Chairman of the board is Ralph Büchi, President of Axel Springer International.

In 2002, it was rumoured that Axel Springer AG was planning an acquisition of Ringier AG.

In July 2007, Springer acquired the German TV programme guides TELE, TV4 and TV2 from Ringier through the subsidiary company Jean Frey AG.

Joint Venture with Axel Springer in Switzerland
On 1 January 2016, the Swiss joint venture Ringier Axel Springer Schweiz AG was founded together with Axel Springer.  The media company's remit includes both companies’ entire magazine portfolios in Switzerland as well as the Le Temps and Handelszeitung newspapers. It employs around 600 people and is located in Zurich.

Ringier Deutschland GmbH
The two premium titles Cicero and Monopol have changed hands: Cicero Editor-in-Chief Christoph Schwennicke and Deputy Editor-in-Chief Alexander Marguier took over the two high-end products on 1 May 2016, as part of a management buyout.

Admeira
On 4 April 2016, the joint sales and marketing organisation from Ringier, Swisscom and Swiss Broadcasting Corporation began operations under the name Admeira.  The project was first launched on 17 August 2015, and Marc Walder was among its initiators. The venture's objective of keeping more digital advertising funds in Switzerland was met with criticism from competitors. The goals of this joint operation were not met. After the Swiss Broadcasting Corporation had already left this venture, Swisscom decided to leave as well, selling their interest in Admeira to Ringier. Therefore, Admeira became a wholly owned subsidiary of Ringier in 2020 concentrating on TV advertising.

La Mobilière
On 3 February 2020, Ringier has granted la Mobilière a 25 percent shareholding. The two companies agree on a long-term cooperation.

Documentation 
 Christian Kolbe: Spuren der Zeit 175 Jahre Ringier – Patriarchen, Presse und Profit. In: DOK, Schweizer Fernsehen, 5. Mai 2008.

Literature 
 Karl Lüönd: Ringier bei den Leuten. Die bewegte Geschichte eines ungewöhnlichen Familienunternehmens. NZZ Libro, Zürich 2008, .
 Peter Meier, Thomas Häusler: Zwischen Masse, Markt und Macht. Das Medienunternehmen Ringier im Wandel (1833–2008). Chronos, Zürich Februar 2010, .
 René Lüchinger: Ringen um Ringier. Steidl, Göttingen 2019, .

References

External links

Ringier Group website

Mass media companies of Switzerland
Newspaper companies
Pan-European media companies
Mass media in Zürich
Companies established in 1833